In mathematics, the Balian–Low theorem in Fourier analysis is named for Roger Balian and Francis E. Low.
The theorem states that there is no well-localized window function (or Gabor atom) g either in time or frequency for an exact Gabor frame (Riesz Basis).

Statement
Suppose g is a square-integrable function on the real line, and consider the so-called Gabor system  

for integers m and n, and a,b>0 satisfying ab=1.  The Balian–Low theorem states that if  

 

is an orthonormal basis for  the Hilbert space

 

then either

Generalizations
The Balian–Low theorem has been extended to exact Gabor frames.

See also 
 Gabor filter (in image processing)

References 
 

Theorems in Fourier analysis